
Laguna Suches or Lago Suches is a lake in the La Paz Department of Bolivia and Puno Region, Peru. Located at an elevation of 4605 m, its surface area is 14.2 km2.

See also 
 Machu Such'i Qhuchi

References 

Lakes of Peru
Lakes of La Paz Department (Bolivia)
Lakes of Puno Region
Bolivia–Peru border
International lakes of South America